Uma Subramaniam is an officer of the Reserve Bank of India, who got embroiled in the sensational Rs 20 lakh scam in December 2003 by a hoax caller claiming to be the then RBI Governor Y. V. Reddy.

Professional career
During her long career in the Reserve Bank, Subramaniam worked as Regional Director of RBI Bhopal, and Chief General Manager of the important Departments of Banking Supervision (DBS) and Non-Banking Supervision (DNBS) at Mumbai. She also excelled as an academician in the field of banking and finance, having donned the chair of Principal of Reserve Bank of India Staff College, Chennai and Vice Principal of Bankers' Training College, Mumbai. She is widely respected for her erudition in the field of financial regulation. Throughout her career she had the reputation of being an honest and upright officer, who never compromised with principles of ethics. It is alleged she was framed in the scam by unscrupulous colleagues who were miffed with her strictness at workplace.

The Scandal
On 18 December 2003, Reserve Bank of India was rocked by one of the most sensational frauds in its history, when Uma Subramaniam, the then Regional Director of RBI, Bhopal, received a call from a person claiming to be a relative of the Governor Dr Y V Reddy, who "badly needed Rs 20 lakh in cash". Without verifying the identity of the caller, Uma Subramaniam arranged the money by asking her employees to immediately withdraw their cash. Subramaniam herself went in an autorickshaw and handed over the cash to the unknown person, who quietly walked away. Later it was discovered that the "Governor's relative" was an impostor. However, the identity of the impostor was never revealed, and the case still remains a mystery. Although the amount involved was small, the modus operandi of the fraud and its subsequent ramifications were unparalleled in the history of Indian banking and finance system.

Subsequent controversy
Subramaniam was charge-sheeted following a departmental enquiry and was demoted from CGM rank to GM due to her gross negligence of duty. But subsequently she found favor with the RBI Top Management and was not only reinstated to her earlier position, but also given important portfolios like supervision and regulation of commercial banks and NBFCs. Her career was revived by the then Deputy Governor of RBI Shyamala Gopinath and she got promoted in 2007. Although she herself had once been embroiled in an act of financial irregularity, she was now given the charge of Monitoring of Fraud in NBFCs, an area where she had proved her efficiency.

Important assignments
 Principal, Reserve Bank of India Staff College, Chennai
 Member Secretary, RBI's  NBFC Rule Review Panel (March 2011)
 Vice Principal, Bankers' Training College, Mumbai

Notes

Reserve Bank of India
Indian women bankers
Indian bankers
Bank fraud
Businesspeople from Mumbai
Businesswomen from Maharashtra
Living people
Year of birth missing (living people)